Alvaro Luis Tavares Vieira (born 10 March 1995) is a Brazilian football player who plays for Dila Gori, on loan from Lviv.

Club career
He made his Ukrainian Premier League debut for FC Lviv on 23 February 2019 in a game against FC Chornomorets Odesa.

On 30 November 2020, Keşla announced the end of Tavares' loan deal by mutual consent.

References

External links
 

1995 births
Footballers from São Paulo
Living people
Brazilian footballers
Association football forwards
Atlético Monte Azul players
FC Lviv players
Shamakhi FK players
FC Dila Gori players
Ukrainian Premier League players
Erovnuli Liga players
Brazilian expatriate footballers
Expatriate footballers in Ukraine
Brazilian expatriate sportspeople in Ukraine
Azerbaijan Premier League players
Expatriate footballers in Azerbaijan
Brazilian expatriate sportspeople in Azerbaijan
Expatriate footballers in Georgia (country)
Brazilian expatriate sportspeople in Georgia (country)